The Red Headed Corpse (also known as The Sensuous Doll and Sweet Spirits) is a 1972 Italian-Turkish giallo film directed by Renzo Russo.

Cast 

 Farley Granger: John Ward 
 Erika Blanc: The Sensuous Doll 
 Krista Nell: The Subservient Doll 
 Ivana Novak: Mala 
 Venantino Venantini  
 Aydin Terzel

References

External links

1972 films
1970s crime thriller films
Giallo films
Films shot in Turkey
1970s Italian films